Hello is the lead single from Australian band the Potbelleez' second album Destination Now.

Appearances in other media 
 The song was performed live on the 2010 revival of Hey Hey It's Saturday.
 The song was used in an advertising campaign for GO!'s 2011 programming with the slogan Let's GO! 2011.

Track listing
iTunes EP
 Hello (Radio edit)
 Hello (Bass Kleph remix)
 Hello (Angger Dimas Remix)
 Hello (Sneaker Fox Remix)

Charts

Certifications

References

2010 singles
2010 songs